The Yaroslavsky mine is a large mine located in the south-eastern Russia in Primorsky Krai. Yaroslavsky represents one of the largest fluorite reserves in Russia having estimated reserves of 51.3 million tonnes of ore grading 30.9% fluorite.

References 

Fluorite mines in Russia